The Bnai Zion Medical Center was established in 1922 as the first Jewish hospital in Haifa, the center offers medical care, education, research and services to the diverse and growing population of northern Israel. In a recent survey in a national newspaper, the Bnai Zion medical center was voted the first hospital in the Haifa region of Israel.

General data 
The Bnai Zion scientific middle is a municipal public clinic with 450 beds. Attention is given to rehabilitation offerings that consist of: orthopedic, neurological, cardiological, bodily and occupational therapy. It gives the region of northern Israel with a complete rehabilitation software. The center has a mean of 142,000 visits consistent with 12 months and the emergency branch receives 65,000 visits. In the middle, 14,000 surgical methods are accomplished per 12 months. There are three,500 births according to yr. The middle has a group of workers of one,800 personnel.

Emergencies 
The hospital is in a state of constant alert, and at any moment it is ready to receive the victims of terrorist attacks. In times of national emergency, the entire medical center switches to crisis mode, and at the time of the attack, it receives severely injured victims, who have a critical need for trauma care.

Cooperation with the army 
The Israeli government has designated the hospital as an official military hospital that meets the medical needs of soldiers in the region. During and after the Second Lebanon War (2006), the hospital treated civilians and provided rehabilitation services to wounded military men and women. The center is within the range of rocket attacks from Lebanon. Since the emergency department of the hospital is vulnerable, Bnai Zion is raising funds to build a new protected underground unit, which will be fortified against nuclear, biological and chemical attacks.

Academic participation 
The Bnai Zion medical center is affiliated with the Ruth & Bruce Rappaport School of Medicine of the Technion – Israel Institute of Technology and serves as a teaching hospital for its students. Many of the center's department heads and physicians are on the faculty and are associated with their various medical research initiatives. The hospital also operates one of the oldest nursing schools in Israel, which offers an academic degree.

Criticism 
According to a report in 2022, Bnai Zion medical center turned away parents who came to the hospital with their child who was referred to the hospital with a life-threatening condition. The hospital refused to admit the baby and told her parents: “Bring a credit card. No credit card? Go home.”

References

External links 
 Bnai Zion Medical Center

Hospitals in Israel
1922 establishments in Mandatory Palestine